Willoughby Aston may refer to:

Sir Willoughby Aston, 2nd Baronet (1640–1702) of the Aston Baronets, High Sheriff of Cheshire
Sir Willoughby Aston, 5th Baronet (c. 1715–1772) of the Aston Baronets, MP for Nottingham
Sir Willoughby Aston, 6th Baronet (c. 1748–1815) of the Aston Baronets